Prabhu Chawla (born 2 October 1946) is an Indian journalist. He was born in Dera Ghazi Khan, Punjab, British India. He is alumni of Deshbandhu college University of Delhi. He started his career as an economics lecturer in Delhi University.
He is the Editorial Director of The New Indian Express, a Chennai-based  newspaper in India. Earlier he was the Editor-in-Chief of the same newspaper.

Career 
Prior to his assignment with The New Indian Express, he was the editor of Language publications in India Today news magazine. Before holding this post he worked as the Group editorial director of India Today Group till November 2010. Mr Chawla has the unique distinction of being the only journalist ever in India whose story  had led to the fall of a Government in New Delhi. He scooped the controversial Jain Commission report on the assassination of Rajiv Gandhi. Its publication in the magazine led to the Congress withdrawing support to the United Front government, which led to the fall of the Inder Kumar Gujral led regime in 1997.

While at India Today, he  hosted a popular talk show Seedhi Baat on Aaj Tak channel where he grilled  prominent personalities. After leaving the group he was replaced by M. J. Akbar. He moved to IBN7 to host weekly talk show Teekhi Baat. 
He also has his own YouTube channel.

After a hiatus of 10 years, he once again returned to host Seedhi Baat on Aaj Tak.

Awards

Prabhu Chawla was awarded the Padma Bhushan by the Indian government in 2003.
A chronological list of various awards and recognition -
 2016: Punjabi Icon Award
 2016: Lifetime Achievement Award - 5th IMWA 2016 awards
 2010: Global Punjabi Society Achievers Award
 2009: Indian Television Academy Award for the Best News and Current Affairs Anchor for Seedhi Baat programme that featured people in the news from politics, culture to sports
 2008: Indian Television Academy Award for the Best Talk Show Host
 2008: Sansui Television Best TV Anchor Award
 2005 : The Hero Honda-Indian Television Academy (ITA) Best Anchor award for `Seedhi Baat’ (telecast on Aajtak)
 2003: Padma Bhushan by the President of India
 2003: Telly Awards — TV NEWS ANCHOR OF THE YEAR
 1998: TSR Kalapeetham Life Time Achievement Award
 1989 : GK REDDY MEMORIAL AWARD for "in recognition of proficiency in writing about national and international events. An acknowledgement of the range and depth of political reporting in India Today.’’
 1985-86: FEROZE GANDHI MEMORIAL AWARD for "meticulous reporting of national affairs and investigative stories".
 1984: VEERESALINGAM INVESTIGATIVE JOURNALISM AWARD instituted by Dr Vasireddi Malathi Trust Hithakarini Samaj, Rajahmundry, Andhra Pradesh

References

External links
 
 Prabhu Chawla on Indian Express

1946 births
Living people
Indian editors
Delhi University alumni
People from Dera Ghazi Khan District
Recipients of the Padma Bhushan in other fields